Ilmensky 2-y is a rural locality (a khutor) in Mikhaylovka Urban Okrug, Volgograd Oblast, Russia. The population was 294 as of 2010. There are 6 streets.

Geography 
Ilmensky 2-y is located 35 km northeast of Mikhaylovka. Bolshaya Glushitsa is the nearest rural locality.

References 

Rural localities in Mikhaylovka urban okrug